Suryaprakash Suwalka (born 6 December 1992) is an Indian first-class cricketer who plays for Rajasthan.

References

External links
 

1992 births
Living people
Indian cricketers
Rajasthan cricketers
People from Bhilwara